Jorge Santiago Rodrigues (born October 9, 1980) is a retired Brazilian mixed martial artist. He was the first Sengoku Middleweight Champion and is the former Strikeforce Middleweight Grand Prix Champion. He has also competed for the UFC, King of the Cage, Titan FC, It's Showtime, and BodogFIGHT.

Mixed martial arts career

Early career
Santiago started his mixed martial arts career at Reality Fighting 2 in 2002 with a win over Jose Rodriguez. In the following years Santago fought for Absolute Fighting Championships, King of the Cage, and a few other small organizations earning an 11–5 record.

Ultimate Fighting Championship
In 2006 he signed with Ultimate Fighting Championships, where he competed three times. He won his UFC debut at UFC Ultimate Fight Night 5 against Justin Levens by first round KO. He returned at UFC Fight Night 6 and UFC Fight Night 7, losing by KO to former WEC Middleweight Champion, Chris Leben in the second round and to Alan Belcher by KO in the third round. He then left the UFC.

Strikeforce
In his first fight after leaving the UFC, Santiago was victorious against Andrei Semenov at the Bodog Fight: Clash of the Nations show in Russia. In his next fight he had to deal with longtime veteran Jeremy Horn and submitted Horn in the first round.

The next challenge for Santiago was the Strikeforce Middleweight tournament on November 16, 2007. Competing in the tournament as the underdog, Santiago won the Grand Prix by defeating Sean Salmon and Trevor Prangley on the same night.

Sengoku
Continuing on his path of success, Santiago became Middleweight Champion, by defeating Yuki Sasaki, Logan Clark, Siyar Bahadurzada, and Kazuhiro Nakamura. The last two fights were on the same night.

Santiago was then crowned World Victory Road's first Middleweight Champion by defeating the acclaimed Kazuo Misaki at World Victory Road Presents: Sengoku no Ran 2009.

He was set to face former UFC 12 Heavyweight Tournament Champion and former UFC Light Heavyweight Champion, Vitor Belfort at Affliction: Trilogy, but the match was scrapped after the cancellation of the event.

Santiago then fought at World Victory Road Presents: Sengoku 11 against current KSW Middleweight Champion, Mamed Khalidov in a non-title bout. Khalidov won by first round knockout; Santiago's first loss since 2006.  He avenged this loss in March 2010 with a split decision victory over Khalidov at Sengoku 12.

Santiago defended his title for a second time when he defeated Kazuo Misaki via TKO at Sengoku 14 in August 2010.

Return to UFC
On February 8, 2011, Santiago requested and was granted his release from World Victory Road. On February 16, he signed a multi-fight contract to return to the Ultimate Fighting Championship.

Santiago lost in his UFC return to former WEC Light Heavyweight Champion Brian Stann at UFC 130 via TKO in the second round.

Santiago then lost by unanimous decision to Brazilian jiu-jitsu specialist Demian Maia at UFC 136.

Following the loss to Maia, Santiago was released from the promotion.

Post-UFC
On March 2, 2012, Santiago won his return fight, knocking out Leonardo Pecanha with a straight right at 1:48 in the first round at Titan Fighting Championships 21  On June 15, 2012 Santiago fought Justin Guthrie at Titan Fighting Championship 23 winning the fight via submission in the first round.

Strikeforce
Santiago was re-signed by Strikeforce (now owned by the UFC's parent company Zuffa, LLC) in August 2012, where he was expected to drop to Welterweight for a bout with former King of the Cage Welterweight Champion Quinn Mulhern at Strikeforce: Melendez vs. Healy on September 29, 2012. However, the event was cancelled the following month due to an injury to headliner Gilbert Melendez, and the Santiago/Mulhern bout was not rescheduled before Strikeforce's closure and absorption into the UFC in January 2013.

Third UFC Stint
Already signed with Strikeforce, and following his own back-to-back wins outside the organization, Santiago was called back to the UFC to take on Gunnar Nelson in a welterweight bout on February 16, 2013 at UFC on Fuel TV: Barão vs. McDonald, replacing an injured Justin Edwards. Santiago lost the fight via unanimous decision and was subsequently released from the promotion for the third time.

World Series of Fighting
Santiago signed with World Series of Fighting in 2013 and made his promotional debut on August 10, 2013 against Gerald Harris at WSOF 4.  The bout had a confusing first round where Harris slammed Santiago and Harris believed he had tapped. However, the referee was stopping the action to deduct a point from Santiago for blatantly grabbing the cage during Harris' slam. Following the confusion, the fight continued and Santiago would go on to lose via unanimous decision.

Jorge Santiago announced on Dec. 14, 2013 to Ariel Helwani that he has retired from MMA competition.

Brazilian jiu-jitsu lineage
Mitsuyo "Count Koma" Maeda → Carlos Gracie, Sr. → Carlson Gracie → Ricardo Liborio → Jorge Santiago

Personal life
Santiago is married. He has a daughter from a previous relationship.

Championships and achievements
Strikeforce
2007 Strikeforce Middleweight Grand Prix Champion
Ultimate Fighting Championship
Fight of the Night (One time)
Sengoku Raiden Championship
 Sengoku Middleweight Championship (One time, First)
2008 Sengoku Middleweight Grand Prix Champion
Sherdog Awards
2010 Fight of the Year vs. Kazuo Misaki
Inside MMA
2010 Bazzie Award for Fight of the Year vs. Kazuo Misaki

Mixed martial arts record

|-
| Loss
| align=center| 25–12
| Gerald Harris
| Decision (unanimous)
| WSOF 4
| 
| align=center| 3
| align=center| 5:00
| Ontario, California, United States
| 
|-
| Loss
| align=center| 25–11
| Gunnar Nelson
| Decision (unanimous)
| UFC on Fuel TV: Barão vs. McDonald
| 
| align=center| 3
| align=center| 5:00
| London, England, United Kingdom
| 
|-
| Win
| align=center| 25–10
| Justin Guthrie
| Submission (inverted heel hook)
| TFC 23
| 
| align=center| 1
| align=center| 1:34
| Fort Riley, Kansas, United States
| 
|-
| Win
| align=center| 24–10
| Leonardo Pecanha
| KO (punches)
| TFC 21
| 
| align=center| 1
| align=center| 1:48
| Kansas City, Kansas, United States
| 
|-
| Loss
| align=center| 23–10
| Demian Maia
| Decision (unanimous)
| UFC 136
| 
| align=center| 3
| align=center| 5:00
| Houston, Texas, United States
| 
|-
| Loss
| align=center| 23–9
| Brian Stann
| KO (punches)
| UFC 130
| 
| align=center| 2
| align=center| 4:29
| Las Vegas, Nevada, United States
| 
|-
| Win
| align=center| 23–8
| Kazuo Misaki
| TKO (corner stoppage)
| World Victory Road Presents: Sengoku Raiden Championships 14
| 
| align=center| 5
| align=center| 4:31
| Tokyo, Japan
| 
|-
| Win
| align=center| 22–8
| Mamed Khalidov
| Decision (split)
| World Victory Road Presents: Sengoku Raiden Championships 12
| 
| align=center| 5
| align=center| 5:00
| Tokyo, Japan
| 
|-
| Loss
| align=center| 21–8
| Mamed Khalidov
| KO (punches)
| World Victory Road Presents: Sengoku 11
| 
| align=center| 1
| align=center| 2:45
| Tokyo, Japan
| 
|-
| Win
| align=center| 21–7
| Kazuo Misaki
| Technical Submission (rear-naked choke)
| World Victory Road Presents: Sengoku no Ran 2009
| 
| align=center| 5
| align=center| 3:26
| Saitama, Japan
| 
|-
| Win
| align=center| 20–7
| Kazuhiro Nakamura
| KO (punches)
| World Victory Road Presents: Sengoku 6
| 
| align=center| 3
| align=center| 0:49
| Saitama, Japan
| 
|-
| Win
| align=center| 19–7
| Siyar Bahadurzada
| Submission (heel hook)
| World Victory Road Presents: Sengoku 6
| 
| align=center| 1
| align=center| 1:10
| Saitama, Japan
| 
|-
| Win
| align=center| 18–7
| Logan Clark
| Submission (arm-triangle choke)
| World Victory Road Presents: Sengoku 5
| 
| align=center| 2
| align=center| 3:55
| Tokyo, Japan
| 
|-
| Win
| align=center| 17–7
| Yuki Sasaki
| Submission (armbar)
| World Victory Road Presents: Sengoku 2
| 
| align=center| 3
| align=center| 2:10
| Tokyo, Japan
| 
|-
| Win
| align=center| 16–7
| Trevor Prangley
| TKO (knee to the body)
| Strikeforce: Four Men Enter, One Man Survives
| 
| align=center| 1
| align=center| 2:31
| San Jose, California, United States
| 
|-
| Win
| align=center| 15–7
| Sean Salmon
| KO (flying knee)
| Strikeforce: Four Men Enter, One Man Survives
| 
| align=center| 1
| align=center| 0:24
| San Jose, California, United States
| 
|-
| Win
| align=center| 14–7
| Jeremy Horn
| Submission (triangle choke)
| Art of War 3: Monson vs. Rizzo
| 
| align=center| 1
| align=center| 3:02
| Dallas, Texas, United States
| 
|-
| Win
| align=center| 13–7
| Andrei Semenov
| TKO (punches)
| Bodog Fight: Clash of the Nations
| 
| align=center| 2
| align=center| 4:48
| St. Petersburg, Russia
| 
|-
| Loss
| align=center| 12–7
| Alan Belcher
| KO (head kick)
| UFC Fight Night: Sanchez vs. Riggs
| 
| align=center| 3
| align=center| 2:45
| San Diego, California, United States
| 
|-
| Loss
| align=center| 12–6
| Chris Leben
| KO (punch)
| UFC Fight Night 6
| 
| align=center| 2
| align=center| 0:35
| Las Vegas, Nevada, United States
| 
|-
| Win
| align=center| 12–5
| Justin Levens
| KO (knee and punches)
| UFC Fight Night 5
| 
| align=center| 1
| align=center| 2:13
| Las Vegas, Nevada, United States
| 
|-
| Win
| align=center| 11–5
| Thomas Russell
| Submission (armbar)
| Fightfest 3
| 
| align=center| 1
| align=center| 1:59
| Youngstown, Ohio, United States
| 
|-
| Win
| align=center| 10–5
| Sydney Machado
| TKO (punches)
| Costa Rica: Fights 3
| 
| align=center| 2
| align=center| 0:49
| Costa Rica
| 
|-
| Win
| align=center| 9–5
| Leopoldo Serao
| TKO (punches)
| Full Throttle 5
| 
| align=center| 1
| align=center| 0:43
| Georgia, United States
| 
|-
| Loss
| align=center| 8–5
| Joey Villaseñor
| Decision (unanimous)
| KOTC 58: Prime Time
| 
| align=center| 3
| align=center| 5:00
| San Jacinto, California, United States
| 
|-
| Loss
| align=center| 8–4
| Jordan Radev
| Decision (unanimous)
| It's Showtime: Amsterdam Arena
| 
| align=center| 2
| align=center| 5:00
| Amsterdam, Holland
| 
|-
| Win
| align=center| 8–3
| Chris Liguori
| Submission (rear-naked choke)
| Euphoria: USA vs World
| 
| align=center| 1
| align=center| 3:27
| Atlantic City, New Jersey, United States
| 
|-
| Loss
| align=center| 7–3
| Diego Sanchez
| Decision (unanimous)
| KOTC 37: Unfinished Business
| 
| align=center| 3
| align=center| 5:00
| San Jacinto, California, United States
| 
|-
| Win
| align=center| 7–2
| Takuya Wada
| Submission (armbar)
| Absolute Fighting Championships 7
| 
| align=center| 1
| align=center| 1:52
| Fort Lauderdale, Florida, United States
| 
|-
| Win
| align=center| 6–2
| John Cronk
| Submission (armbar)
| KOTC 32: Bringing Heat
| 
| align=center| 2
| align=center| 0:54
| Miami, Florida, United States
| 
|-
| Loss
| align=center| 5–2
| Keith Wisniewski
| KO (punches)
| Absolute Fighting Championships 6
| 
| align=center| 3
| align=center| 2:14
| Fort Lauderdale, Florida, United States
| 
|-
| Win
| align=center| 5–1
| LaVerne Clark
| Submission (triangle choke)
| Hardcore Fighting Championships 2
| 
| align=center| 1
| align=center| 2:17
| Revere, Massachusetts, United States
| 
|-
| Win
| align=center| 4–1
| Derrick Noble
| Decision (unanimous)
| Absolute Fighting Championships 5
| 
| align=center| 2
| align=center| 5:00
| Fort Lauderdale, Florida, United States
| 
|-
| Loss
| align=center| 3–1
| Manny Gamburyan
| KO (punch)
| KOTC 27: Aftermath
| 
| align=center| 1
| align=center| 0:21
| San Jacinto, California, United States
| 
|-
| Win
| align=center| 3–0
| Justin Wieman
| Submission (triangle choke)
| Absolute Fighting Championships 4
| 
| align=center| 1
| align=center| 4:11
| Fort Lauderdale, Florida, United States
| 
|-
| Win
| align=center| 2–0
| Jay Martin
| KO (punches)
| HOOKnSHOOT: Boot Camp 1.1
| 
| align=center| 1
| align=center| 0:14
| Evansville, Indiana, United States
| 
|-
| Win
| align=center| 1–0
| Jose Rodriguez
| Submission (knees)
| Reality Fighting 2
| 
| align=center| 1
| align=center| 1:16
| Wildwood, New Jersey, United States
|

References

External links

Official UFC Profile

Living people
Brazilian male mixed martial artists
Middleweight mixed martial artists
Mixed martial artists utilizing Muay Thai
Mixed martial artists utilizing Brazilian jiu-jitsu
Brazilian practitioners of Brazilian jiu-jitsu
People awarded a black belt in Brazilian jiu-jitsu
Brazilian Muay Thai practitioners
Sportspeople from Rio de Janeiro (city)
Brazilian expatriate sportspeople in the United States
World Victory Road champions
1980 births
Ultimate Fighting Championship male fighters